The following chefs have appeared in Great British Menu cooking their own four-course menus: starter, fish, main, and dessert. The first four series use public voting in only the finals week. 

Colour key:

Series 1 (2006)

In only series one, three highest-scored dishes of each of four courses are shortlisted for public voting. A chef who won one of courses is then eliminated from any subsequent courses they had been shortlisted for.

Introduced in series 1

Galton Blackiston

Galton Blackiston has been a chef patron of Michelin-starred Morston Hall. Blackiston won the Midlands and East heat in series one. He lost to Sat Bains in series two.

John Burton-Race

John Burton-Race, chef patron of Michelin-starred restaurant The New Angel (Dartmouth, Devon) at the time of the competition, in series one (2006) lost the South West heat to Michael Caines.

Michael Caines

Michael Caines, executive head chef of Gidleigh Park (closed for eleven-month renovation until 11 December 2006 reopening) and co-owner of ABode Hotel (Glasgow, Scotland), won the South West heat in series one (2006) but lost to Mark Hix in series two (2007). He was appointed Member of the Order of the British Empire (MBE) in June 2006. He reappeared as mentor/chef judge in series five (2010), six (2011), and seventeen (2022).

Richard Corrigan

Richard Corrigan ran the Michelin-starred restaurant Lindsay House (Soho) and another restaurant Bentley's Oyster Bar (Piccadilly) when he first competed in the series. Also representing Northern Ireland, he served his winning dish "smoked salmon with blinis, woodland sorrel and wild cress" as Starter course of Queen Elizabeth II's 80th birthday banquet in series one (2006) and another winning dish "whole poached wild salmon and duck egg dressing with wheaten bread and country butter" in series two (2007) as Fish course of another banquet, located at the British Embassy in Paris. Corrigan has reappeared as a mentor/veteran chef from series four onwards. He re-competed in the Great British Waste Menu special (2010) alongside Angela Hartnett, Simon Rimmer, and Matt Tebbutt.

Angela Hartnett

Angela Hartnett lost the Wales heat to Bryn Williams in series one (2006) and to Stephen Terry in series three (2008). She re-competed in the Great British Waste Menu special (2010) alongside Richard Corrigan, Simon Rimmer, and Matt Tebbutt. She has reappeared as mentor/chef judge from series six (2011) onward.

Atul Kochhar

Atul Kochhar became the first Michelin-starred Indian chef in the UK when a Mayfair restaurant Tamarind, where he was its head chef, earned its star in 2001. Kochhar, who ran his own Michelin-starred Mayfair restaurant Benares at the time of competition, won the South East heat twice in series one (2006) and two (2007). He lost the London and South East heat to Jason Atherton in series three (2008).

Tom Lewis

Tom Lewis is a chef of the Monachyle Mhor hotel and restaurant. He lost the Scotland heat to Nick Nairn in series one. Lewis's family moved from Wales and bought a  farm, which then became his parents' bed and breakfast in order "to supplement their income", and then became a "four-star, 14-bedroom hotel and hub" known as Monachyle Mhor.

Nick Nairn

Nick Nairn established his restaurant, Braeval, near Aberfoyle in Scotland in 1986. Braeval received its first Michelin star in 1991, making Nairn the youngest Michelin-starred chef in Scotland at the time. When he first competed in the series, he ran his eponymous cooking school Nick Nairn Cook School and a hotel. In 2006, Nairn served his winning dish "loin of roe venison with potato cake, roast roots, creamed cabbage and game gravy" as the Main course of Queen Elizabeth II's 80th birthday banquet. In series two, Nairn lost the Scotland heat to Jeremy Lee in the judging round.

Paul Rankin

A celebrity chef Paul Rankin opened a restaurant Roscoff's in 1989 at the Shaftesbury Square of Northern Ireland. Roscoff's, the first Michelin-starred restaurant in Northern Ireland, held its Michelin star for eight years until December 1999 or January 2000. Roscoff's was rebuilt into and re-established as a converted brasserie Cayenne nine months later in 2000. He in series one lost the Northern Ireland heat to Richard Corrigan in the judging round.

Gary Rhodes

Gary Rhodes lost the South East heat to Atul Kochhar in series one (2006). That same year, Rhodes was appointed Officer of the Order of the British Empire (OBE). He died in Dubai, United Arab Emirates, on 26 November 2019 of a subdural haematoma (normally associated with a brain injury), confirmed by his family.

Simon Rimmer

Simon Rimmer, chef patron of Greens, lost the North heat in series one to Marcus Wareing. He re-competed in the Great British Waste Menu special (2010) alongside Richard Corrigan, Angela Hartnett, and Matt Tebbutt.

Antony Worrall Thompson

Antony Worrall Thompson in series one (2006) lost the Midlands and East heat to Galton Blackiston.

Marcus Wareing

Marcus Wareing, then-head chef of Michelin-starred restaurant Pétrus, in series one (2006) represented the North region and served his winning dish "custard tart with nutmeg" as Dessert course of Queen Elizabeth II's 80th birthday banquet. The following year, in 2007, he in series two lost to Mark Broadbent in the North region heat. Pétrus earned its second Michelin that same year. Wareing started reappearing as mentor/chef judge from series four (2009) onward. Replacing Michel Roux Jr. in 2014, Wareing then has been one of judges of MasterChef: The Professionals since.

Bryn Williams

Bryn Williams, when he first competed, was the senior sous-chef of Terrence Conran's London restaurant Orrery. Representing Wales, he served his winning dish "pan-fried turbot with cockles and oxtail" as the Fish course of Queen Elizabeth II's 80th birthday banquet in series one. Williams moved to Odette's in autumn 2006 and became its head chef. In October 2008, he became the chef-proprietor of Odette's. He re-competed and won the Wales heat in series two (2007). He reappeared as a mentor in series four (2009).

Series 2 (2007)

Introduced in series 2

Sat Bains

Representing the Midlands and East region, Sat Bains in series two (2007) served his winning dish "Ham, egg and peas" as the Starter course of a banquet in the British Embassy in Paris, hosted by its British ambassador. Bains lost the Central region heat to Glynn Purnell in series three (2008). He reappeared as a mentor/chef judge in series four (2009), nine (2014), and ten (2015).

Bains became the head chef of an eatery at the Hotel des Clos (Nottinghamshire) in 1999. The place earned its first Michelin star in 2003 and then was renamed Restaurant Sat Bains with Rooms in 2005 with the eponymous chef as its chef patron.

Mark Broadbent
Mark Broadbent, when first competed, was the executive chef of London restaurant Bluebird Dining Room, rebuilt and reestablished in late 2004 from the original members-only restaurant Bluebird Club. He won the North region heat in series two (2007), beating Marcus Wareing. Broadbent reappeared in series three (2008) auditioning alongside other three chefs to represent the North region but did not pass the test. After four years, Broadbent left Bluebird in late 2008 to become a consultant chef. He began working for a Chelsea bar and restaurant Eighty-Six in November 2010 at its establishment.

Stuart Gillies

Stuart Gillies, executive chef of Gordon Ramsay's Boxwood Café when first competed, lost the South East heat to Atul Kochhar in series two (2007). Gillies previously worked at Aubergine and Le Caprice in the 20th century. He then was a chef of Teatro, co-owned by ex-footballer Lee Chapman and actress Leslie Ash, in late 1990s. One of Teatro's consultant shareholders was Gordon Ramsay.

Mark Hix

Representing the South West region, Mark Hix in series two (2007) served his two winning dishes "Rabbit and crayfish stargazy pie" and "Perry jelly with summer fruits and elderflower ice cream" as, respectively, Main and Dessert courses of a banquet in the British Embassy in Paris, hosted by its British ambassador. In July 2007, Hix resigned as the chef-director Caprice Holdings, a restaurant group owning London restaurants, including the Ivy, Le Caprice, Scott's, J Sheekey (seafood), Daphne's (Italian), Bam-Bou (Vietnamese) and two Rivington Grill restaurants. He reappeared as mentor chef in series four (2009).

Jeremy Lee

Jeremy Lee won the Scotland heat in series two (2007), beating Nick Nairn. He reappeared as a mentor/chef judge from series four (2009) onward.

Noel McMeel

Noel McMeel, head chef of Castle Leslie (County Monaghan) when first competed, lost the Northern Ireland heat to Richard Corrigan in series two (2007) and then to Danny Millar in series three (2008).

McMeel worked as a chef for an eatery of the Beech Hill Country House Hotel (Derry), the former residence of a Northern Ireland High Court judge, in 1990s. He became a chef patron of a Magherafelt restaurant Trompets in late 1990s and won a National Training Award (UK) on 8 December 1998. He was reported in February 2001 to become the head chef of Castle Leslie and then in September 2008 to become the head chef of an eatery at the Lough Erne Golf Resort (County Fermanagh). He co-wrote a 2013 cookbook Irish Pantry: Traditional Breads, Preserves, and Goodies to Feed the Ones You Love (eBook:) with Lynn Marie Hulsman.

Matt Tebbutt

Matt Tebbutt, chef patron of The Foxhunter (Nant-y-derry) when first competed, lost the Wales heat to Bryn Williams in series two (2007). He is a current host of Saturday Kitchen.

Series 3 (2008)

Each of four chefs representing their own region cooks just one dish for one of judges in a regional audition. Only two chefs of each region are selected to cook their menus.

Introduced in series 3

Jason Atherton

Representing London and South East region and as the head chef of Michelin-starred London restaurant Maze, Jason Atherton served his two winning dishes "B.L.T. & croque monsieur with truffles" and "beef fillet, ox cheek, marrow bone & smoked pomme purée" as, respectively, Starter and Main courses of the Gherkin banquet in series three (2008). Atherton reappeared as chef mentor/judge from series four (2009) to eight (2013) and re-competed in the 2020 Great British Christmas Menu special for the Main course preliminary round.

Elisha Carter

Elisha Carter, chef of the Charlton House restaurant in Somerset, lost the South West heat to the Chris Horridge in series three.

Anthony Flinn

Anthony Flinn, head chef of Leeds restaurant Anthony's at Flannels at the time of competition, lost the North region heat to Nigel Haworth in series three (2008).

Matthew Gray
Matthew Gray was the head chef of Michelin-starred restaurant Inverlochy Castle (Fort William, Highland) when he first competed. Gray lost the Scotland region heat to Tom Kitchin in series three (2008).

Nigel Haworth
When he first competed, Nigel Haworth was the head chef and (co-)proprietor of Northcote Manor and two gastropubs Three Fishes and the Highwayman Inn. He won the North regional heat in series three (2008), beating the runner-up Anthony Flinn. In series four (2009), representing the North West region, he served his winning dish "Lonk lamb Lancashire hotpot, roast loin, pickled red cabbage, carrots and leeks" as the Main course of the Halton House banquet honouring British military personnel who returned from the war in Afghanistan. He reappeared in the series as mentor/judge chef in series five (2010), six (2011), and seven (2012).

Chris Horridge
Chris Horridge (born 2 June 1970), a head chef of a Michelin-starred restaurant at the Bath Priory hotel when first competed, notoriously promoted healthy and nutritious eating especially by using alternative ingredients to traditionally used ones. Horridge won the South West heat in series three (2008). In the finals, his starter course was top-rated by the judges, but the public vote resulted in Jason Atherton's starter course being served for the banquet.

Horridge attended Gainsborough College (Lincolnshire) from mid-to-late 1980s. Throughout late 1980s and 1990s, he was the Senior Aircraftsman Cook for the Royal Air Force. He further worked as the senior chef de partie of Le Petit Blanc (Oxford) in 1997–98, a commis chef and then the senior sous chef of Le Manoir aux Quat'Saisons in 1998–2003, and a personal chef of a Canadian billionaire John MacBain.

Horridge left the Bath Priory hotel in 2009 to become the executive chef of Cliveden House (Berkshire), which had three restaurants Waldo's, The Terrace, and The Club Room. He then stinted as a chef director of The Fine Dining Academy, held by 10 in 8 Fine Dining Group. In order to further promote and develop healthy eating lifestyles, he then launched AllFoodi in 2012, founded the Nutrition Research Group, and worked at Ronan Foods.

Tom Kitchin

A head chef of Michelin-starred restaurant The Kitchin, Tom Kitchin won the Scotland heat in series three (2008) and four (2009).

Danny Millar
Danny Millar won the Northern Ireland heat in series three (2008) and four (2009). Millar began his cooking career at age 16 and has worked "in Michelin-starred eateries in London and Germany". From September 2006 onward, he was the head chef and director of Balloo House in Killinchy, County Down. He won the "best chef award" in the 2010 awards ceremony by the Restaurants Association of Ireland (RAI). Besides the Balloo House, the Balloo Inns Ltd under Millar and partners Ronan and Jennie Sweeney owned two other restaurants, the Parson's Nose (Hillsborough, County Down) and a Lisbane pub Lisbarnett House, the latter purchased from another restaurant group in 2012 for about £700,000. The pub was renamed the Poacher's Pocket. Millar declared bankruptcy in 2016. In 2019, Millar opened the Stock Kitchen and Bar in a mezzanine of St George's Market (Belfast).

Glynn Purnell

Representing the Central region and head chef of Michelin-starred Birmingham restaurant Purnell's, Glynn Purnell served his winning dish "burnt English cream with strawberries, black pepper honeycomb, and tarragon" as the Dessert course of the Gherkin banquet in series three (2008). He also served another winning dish "Masala spiced monkfish with red lentils, pickled carrots and coconut" as the Fish course of the banquet for British military personnel returning from the War in Afghanistan in series four (2009). Purnell reappeared as a chef judge/mentor from series five (2010) to eight (2013).

Stephen Terry

London-born Stephen Terry, chef-proprietor of a gastropub The Hardwick, representing the Wales region, served his winning dish "organic salmon, smoked salmon, and salmon mousse with crab fritter and cockle 'popcorn" as the Fish course of the Gherkin banquet in series three (2008). He lost the Wales heat to James Sommerin in series four and won the Wales heat in series seven (2012). He appeared as a chef mentor/judge in series five (2010) for the Wales heat.

Chefs not selected to cook their menus
The following first-time chefs were eliminated in regional heats, making them unable to cook their menus:

 Aaron Patterson (Central) – Patterson started as sous chef of Michelin-starred Oakham restaurant Hambleton Hall at age 16 in mid-1980s and then was trained at Raymond Blanc's Belmond Le Manoir aux Quat'Saisons. He then became the head chef of Hambleton at age 23 in 1992 and its part-owner years later.
 Rupert Rowley (Central) – Rowley worked for Fischer's Baslow Hall (Baslow) for almost seventeen years until 2019, including his tenure as its head chef. He also was a co-owner of another Baslow restaurant Rowley's Restaurant and Bar.
 Adebola Adeshina (London and South East) – Adeshina previously worked as trainee baker at a Hackney bagel factory in his teens and then in Michelin-starred restaurants, including six-year stint in ones owned by Gordon Ramsay Holdings, like Aubergine and Petrus. He became the chef patron of the Lock restaurant, which opened in February 2006. He then worked as chef patron of other restaurants: Parsons (Waltham Abbey), then a restaurant at The Petersham hotel (Richmond, London) from 2014, and then Chubby Castor (Castor, Cambridgeshire) from late 2017.
 Jake Watkins (London and South East) – Watkins had been chef patron of JSW (Petersfield, Hampshire) from early 2000s to early 2019, the year when he sold the restaurant, which lost its Michelin star that same year after its star retention from 2004.
 Michael Wignall (North) – After five years as executive chef at a Michelin-starred eatery of the Devonshire Arms hotel (Yorkshire), Wignall became the head chef of the Latymer, which reopened in November 2007, at a Surrey manor hotel Pennyhill Park. After holding two Michelin stars for the Latymer, in mid-2010s, Wignall moved to Brownsword Hotels' Gidleigh Park as executive head chef. Wignall left Gidleigh Park in late 2017 or January 2018 and then became chef patron of the Angel, an inn in Hetton, in September 2018 with his wife Johanna as its co-owner.
 Liz Moore (Northern Ireland) – When she first appeared, Moore was a chef of the Belle Isle School of Cookery (Lisbellaw).
 Nick Price (Northern Ireland) – A chef since 1970s, Price was chef-proprietor of Nick's Warehouse (Cathedral Quarter, Belfast) when he first appeared.
 Tony Singh (Scotland) – see
 Michael Smith (Scotland) – see
 Richard Guest (South West) – At the time of competition, Richard Guest was the head chef of The Castle at Taunton (Taunton).
 Chris Wicks (South West) – At the time of competition, Chris Wicks was a chef of Bell's Diner (Bristol).
 Chris Chown (Wales) – ?
 James Sommerin (Wales) – see #James Sommerin

Series 4 (2009)

Introduced in series 4

Kenny Atkinson

Kenny Atkinson was head chef of Michelin-starred restaurant Seaham Hall when first competed and represented the North East region twice. In series four (2009), as result of the now-defunct public vote, he served his winning dish "salad of Aberdeen Angus beef, carrots, horseradish, and Shetland Black potatoes" as the Starter course of the banquet for British military personnel returning from the War in Afghanistan. In series five (2010), he served another winning dish "mackerel with pickled gooseberries, gooseberry wine jelly and gooseberry purée" as the Fish course of the banquet celebrating local produce.

Aiden Byrne

Daniel Clifford

Daniel Clifford, head chef of Michelin-starred restaurant Midsummer House, competed four times in the series as Central heat contender. Clifford lost to Glynn Purnell in series four (2009) and then to Will Holland in series five (2010). Representing the Central region, he served his winning dish "Slow poached chicken, sweetcorn egg, spinach with bacon and peas" as the Main course of the Olympics banquet in series seven (2012) and another winning dish "Going Out with a Bang" as one of two Dessert courses (alongside Richard Davies's dish) of the Comic Relief banquet. Since then, he has appeared as a chef mentor/judge from series nine (2014) onwards.

Ian Matfin
Ian Matfin, one of Michael Caines's proteges and a chef of a restaurant from ABode Manchester hotel at the time, lost the North East region heat to Kenny Atkinson in series four (2009). In 2012, Matfin was reported to work at Henry Tudor House (Shrewsbury). He was an executive head chef of Rockliffe Hall (County Durham) from October 2020 to 2021. He then became a head chef of The Arnage, which officially opened on 19 May 2022.

Matfin also previously worked at other restaurants, like Gordon Ramsay at Claridge's, other Gordon Ramsay restaurants, and Raymond Blanc's Le Manoir aux Quat' Saisons.

Alan Murchison

Nathan Outlaw

Shaun Rankin

Mark Sargeant

Mark Sargeant, then-head chef of Michelin-starred restaurant Gordon Ramsay at Claridge's (now defunct), lost the London and South East heat to Tristan Welch in series four (2009).

James Sommerin

Clare Smyth

Tristan Welch
Tristan Welch was raised in Cambridge. Welch, head chef of a Kensington restaurant Launceston Place when first competed, won the London and South East heat in series four (2009). Welch was eliminated before the judging round of the region heat in series five (2010). He worked as an executive chef of a Mustique eatery Beach Café of the Cotton House hotel in mid-2010s for three years and then as that of a Cambridge brasserie Parker's Tavern from 2018.

References

Chefs